William P. Didusch (1895-1981) was a scientific illustrator known for his work for the American Urological Association.

References

External links
The William P. Didusch Center for Urologic History

Urology
Scientific illustrators
1895 births
1981 deaths
Artists from Baltimore